Suhača may refer to:

 Suhača (Novi Grad), a village in Bosnia and Herzegovina
 Suhača, Livno, a village in Bosnia and Herzegovina